Thane Assembly constituency  is one of the 288 Vidhan Sabha (Assembly) constituencies of Maharashtra, India. It is one of the six assembly seats which make up Thane (Lok Sabha constituency). Thane is near Mumbai.

Members of Legislative Assembly

Election results

2019

2014

See also
 Thane

References

Assembly constituencies of Thane district
Thane
Assembly constituencies of Maharashtra
Year of establishment missing